8 Chords, 328 Words is the sixth EP by the American punk rock band Pinhead Gunpowder. It was released on June 27, 2000 through Lookout! Records.

Track listing
All songs written by Aaron Cometbus

Side A
"Landlords" – 2:10

Side B
"Black Mountain Pt. 3 – 1:06

References

Pinhead Gunpowder albums
2000 EPs
Lookout! Records EPs